Starwing, star wings, or variation, may refer to:

Entertainment and sports
 Starwings Basel, the "Starwings" basketball team from Basel, Switzerland
 Star Fox (1993 video game), released as Starwing in PAL regions, first game in the Nintendo Star Fox series
 Starwings (1984 novel) novel by George Wyatt Proctor
 star wing, the science fiction military unit space equivalent to Wing (military aviation unit)

Fictional characters
 Leyerlain Starwing (dark elf) a fictional character from the 2001 Dragonlance novel by Nancy Varian Berberick,  The Inheritance (novel)

Aviation
 Starwing, a U.S. aircraft manufacturer, see List of aircraft (St)
 EAE European Air Express (1999-2007) callsign STARWING; see List of defunct airlines of Germany
 Astronaut wings, colloquially

See also

 
 
 
 
 Starwing Paradox (2018 video game) an arcade game from Square-Enix
 Space Wing (disambiguation)
 Star (disambiguation)
 Wing (disambiguation)
 Wingstar (disambiguation)